Médée Bay is a natural bay off the island of Newfoundland in the province of Newfoundland and Labrador, Canada. It faces the modern village and archeological site of L'Anse aux Meadows.

References

Bays of Newfoundland and Labrador